Wilbourn is a surname. Notable people with the surname include:

Claudia Wilbourn (born 1951), American bodybuilder
 George Reed Wilbourn (1922–2011), American jazz musician
Makeba Wilbourn (born 1973), American psychologist and professor

English-language surnames